Cara Williams (born Bernice Kamiat; June 29, 1925 – December 9, 2021) was an American film and television actress. She was best known for her role as Billy's Mother in The Defiant Ones (1958), for which she was nominated for the Academy Award for Best Supporting Actress, and for her role as Gladys Porter on the 1960–62 CBS television series Pete and Gladys, for which she was nominated for the Emmy Award for Best Lead Actress in a Comedy. At the time of her death, Williams was one of the last surviving actors from the Golden Age of Hollywood.

Personal life
Williams was born Bernice Kamiat to a Romanian Jewish mother and an Austrian Jewish father. She began making impersonations of all the screen stars she watched in the movies there, and knew she wanted to be an actress. Her parents divorced, and her mother relocated her to Los Angeles, where she chose Cara Williams as her stage name and attended the Hollywood Professional School. Soon she began performing in radio, and at the age of 16 in 1941, she was signed to a film contract and began performing in bit roles, credited as Bernice Kay.

Williams married Alan Gray in 1945; they had a daughter, Cathy Gray, but the marriage ended after two years. Williams then married John Drew Barrymore in 1952. The marriage was troubled and they divorced in 1959. Their son, John Blyth Barrymore, is a former actor. Her third husband was Los Angeles real-estate entrepreneur Asher Dann; the couple remained together until his death in 2018, aged 83.

Film and television

Williams's first credited role was in the Western Wide Open Town released in 1941. She followed this with the dramas Girls Town (1942) and Happy Land (1943) with Don Ameche. She appeared uncredited in the Oscar-nominated musical film Sweet and Low-Down and as a secretary in the Oscar-winning film Laura (both 1944) directed by Otto Preminger. She also had a supporting role in the drama In the Meantime, Darling, which stars Jeanne Crain.  Around this time, she took some time off, marrying her first husband, Alan Gray, in 1945, and having her daughter Cathy.

She had supporting roles in the Oscar-nominated films Boomerang (1947) directed by Elia Kazan, and (uncredited) in Sitting Pretty (1948). She next had supporting roles in The Saxon Charm (1948), which stars Susan Hayward, and Knock on Any Door (1949), which stars Humphrey Bogart.

Williams started the early 1950s by appearing often in television. She played supporting roles in the musicals The Girl Next Door (1953) and The Great Diamond Robbery (1954). She also appeared in Monte Carlo Baby (1951), a comedy with Audrey Hepburn. Williams took time off during this period in which she was married to John Drew Barrymore and gave birth to their son, John Blyth Barrymore, in 1954.

Williams performed in the film Meet Me in Las Vegas (1956), in which she performs the song "I Refuse to Rock n Roll" and a supporting role in The Helen Morgan Story (1957), which stars Ann Blyth and Paul Newman. She was cast as Billy's mother in The Defiant Ones (1958), which was nominated for the Academy Award for Best Picture and for which she was nominated for the Golden Globe and Academy Award for Best Supporting Actress. In Never Steal Anything Small (1959), a musical comedy, she appeared with James Cagney. Williams also co-starred with Danny Kaye in the comedy film The Man from the Diner's Club (1963).

Williams appeared in four episodes of Alfred Hitchcock Presents: "Decoy" (1956), "De Mortuis" (1956), "Last Request" (1957), and "The Cure" (1960). From 1960 to 1962, she starred in the CBS television comedy series Pete and Gladys, with Harry Morgan as Pete. The series was a spin-off of the CBS comedy December Bride, in which Morgan appeared from 1954 to 1959 as Pete Porter. Gladys, his wife, was referred to throughout the entire run of that series but never shown. Williams brought the character to life with Morgan retaining his role as her husband. Williams was nominated for the Emmy Award for Best Lead Actress in a Comedy. For the next two years, while still under contract to the network, CBS kept her in the public eye by repeating Pete and Gladys episodes as part of its morning line-up, an unusual move for a short-run series. CBS returned Williams to prime time in 1964 in her own series, The Cara Williams Show, in which she and Frank Aletter portrayed a married couple who had to keep their marriage secret from their employer. It lasted only one season.

During the 1970s, Williams's acting appearances became less frequent. In 1971, she had a supporting role in the film Doctors' Wives. She also guest-starred in three episodes of Rhoda in 1975, in the role of Mae.  Her last television performance was in a 1977 episode of Visions. Her last film role came in 1978 with The One Man Jury.

Retirement and death
After retiring from acting, Williams began a career as an interior designer. She resided in Los Angeles and was married to real-estate entrepreneur (and former actor) Asher Dann, her third husband, until his death in 2018. Williams died on December 9, 2021, at the age of 96.

Filmography

Film

Television

References

External links
 
 
 
 

1925 births
2021 deaths
20th-century American actresses
Actresses from New York (state)
American film actresses
American people of Romanian-Jewish descent
American people of Austrian-Jewish descent
American television actresses
Barrymore family
People from Flatbush, Brooklyn
Jewish American actresses
American interior designers
21st-century American Jews
21st-century American women